Petrarch is a crater on Mercury. This crater is located within the distorted terrain on the opposite side of the planet from the Caloris Basin. It was named after Petrarch, the medieval Italian poet, by the IAU in 1976.

See also
 List of craters on Mercury

References

Impact craters on Mercury
Petrarch